96FM may refer to:
 Cork's 96FM, a Radio station in Cork, Ireland
 96fm (Perth radio station), a Radio station in Perth, Western Australia